Phoenix 2020 is a South Korean television romantic drama series directed by Lee Hyun-jik starring Hong Soo-ah, Lee Jae-woo, Seo Ha-jun and Park Young-rin. The series is a reboot of the 2004 MBC series of the same name and includes 120 episodes. The story follows a rich woman and a poor man who marry, get divorced, and meet again after their fortunes have reversed. It premiered on SBS TV on October 26, 2020 and aired weekdays at 8:35a.m. KST until April 9, 2021.

Synopsis
Wealthy chaebol Lee Ji-eun (Hong Soo-ah) falls in love with the poor Jang Sae-hoon and marries against their families' wishes. Ji-eun was engaged to Sae-hoon's family friend, Seo Jeong-in (Seo Ha-jun), but he was in a committed relationship with another woman. The couple was expecting a child despite the lack of approval from Jeong-in's father. Ji-eun and Sae-hoon eventually divorce, and Jeong-in later dies. After ten years, Ji-eun and Sae-hoon meet again but with swapped lifestyles. Once affluent, Ji-eun lost her fortune while Sae-hoon became a rich entrepreneur. Their changes in wealth allow them to view the world differently and understand each other leading to their reunification.

However, they both have other love interests. Ji-eun meets Seo Jeong-min (Seo Ha-jun), heir to the Seorin Group and Jeong-in's twin brother, and they start going out while Sae-hoon is dating his girlfriend, Mi-ran. At the same time, Jeong-min's ambitious stepmother, Choi Myung-hwa, wants to hang on to Seorin Group at all costs. She is Mi-ran's mother but living under an assumed name and has not seen Mi-ran in years. Jeong-min dislikes Myung-hwa, and Seo Moon-soo (chairman of Seorin Group, Jeong-min's father, and Myung-hwa's husband) plans to remove her.

The show ends with a series of legal cases against Seorin Group, ironically brought to court by Jeong-min himself after he tires of his father's controlling tendencies. Seo Moon-soo is angry at his only living son after Jeong-in's death. In the legal chaos, Moon-soo jettisons Myung-hwa but she kills him and stays with her daughter. Ji-eun and Jeong-min break up, and Ji-eun and Sae-hoon start to work together again.

Cast

Main
 Hong Soo-ah as Lee Ji-eun, a chaebol, ten years later helper
 Lee Jae-woo as Jang Sae-hoon aka William Jang
 Seo Ha-joon as Seo Jeong-min
 Park Young-rin as Miranda

Supporting
 Yang Hye-jin as Cho Hyun-sook
 Kim Seung-hyun as Cho Hyun-min Lee Ji-eun's maternal uncle
 Lee Chung-mi as Ji-eun's younger sister
 Jeong Seo-ha as Lee Young-eun, Lee Ji-eun's sister
 Ok Ji-young as Nam Bok-ja, Lee Ji-eun's best friend
Jang Se-hun's family and people around him
 Shin Seong-gyun as Jang Ji-wook, Jang Se-hoon's father
 Kim Ho-chang as Kim Ho-jin, Jang Se-hun's best friend
 
Seo Jeong-min's family and people around him
 Kim Jong-seok as Seo Moon-soo 
 Seo Ha-joon as Seo Jeong-in 
 Hyuna Sung as Choi Myung-hwa /Baek Soon Su 
 Yang Hong-seok as Shin A-jun
 Lee Chung-mi as Seo Eun Ju, secretary to Seo Jeong-min
 
Others
 Oh Cho-hee as Hannah Na-kyung 
 Kim Byung-chun as Park Kwang-cheol 
 Kang Sung-jin as Lecturer

Production
On June 30, 2020, SBS announced their remake of the 2004 drama Phoenix with the original writer, Lee Yoo-jin. The remake ran for 120 episodes, a much longer run compared to the original's 26 episodes. Lee Yoo-jin commented on the story, "It seems to be a different story from the original. The setting of reunion between Lee Ji-eun and Jang Se-hoon is changed, but the reunion and love journey of the two are different from the original. After reuniting the once-loved man and woman,  the process of recovering and understanding the wounds that have been inflicted on each other has been depicted, rather than the ending of achieving love again." Filming started in the second half of 2020 and a production presentation was held on October 20, 2020.

Release
The television series first aired on October 26, 2020, on SBS TV and aired on weekday mornings until April 9, 2021.

Original soundtrack

Part 1

Part 2

Part 3

Part 4

Part 5

Part 6

Part 7

Part 8

Part 9

Part 10

Part 11

Part 12

Part 13

Part 14

Part 15

Part 16

Viewership

Awards and nominations

Notes

References

External links
  
 Phoenix 2020 at Daum 
 

Seoul Broadcasting System television dramas
2020 South Korean television series debuts
Korean-language television shows
South Korean romance television series
Television remakes
Television series by Samhwa Networks
Television series by Studio S
2021 South Korean television series endings